Dean Winter (born 4 May 1985) is a Tasmanian Labor politician. He was elected as Mayor of Kingborough Council in 2018, and was elected to the Tasmanian House of Assembly at the 2021 Tasmanian state election, as an MP for Franklin.

Political career
Following an unsuccessful candidacy for the Electoral division of Hobart at the 2012 Tasmanian Legislative Council periodic election, Winter became the Chief Executive Officer of TasICT, the peak body representing Tasmania's ICT sector. This coincided with the National Broadband Network rollout in Tasmania which subsequently became an issue in Tasmania at the 2013 Australian federal election.  Winter and TasICT argued the Tasmanian rollout should be completed using Fibre to the Premises (FttP) technology, while the Coalition had already announced it would use a mix of technologies, including Fibre to the Node (FttN), which they said would be easier and more affordable to deploy.

In 2014, Winter successfully contested the Kingborough Council election for the position of Councillor. Following the 2018 Tasmanian state election, Winter was appointed senior economics adviser to Opposition leader Rebecca White. However, the Labor Left faction attempted to censure Winter later in 2018, due to comments Winter made around Kingborough Council's behaviour being "authoritarian" in regards to an overturned decision that was made to destroy a dog, which were interpreted as anti-worker. Winter said that his criticism was aimed "at the leadership of council, not its staff". The censure attempt was unsuccessful, with White intervening to stop the issue from being addressed at the party conference. Winter ultimately won the Kingborough mayoral election, held later that year, with 61.93% of the vote.

Winter was initially denied preselection in the seat of Franklin for the 2021 Tasmanian state election, with the Labor Left rumoured to be opposed to him becoming a candidate. Former Labor premier David Bartlett labelled Winter an "outstanding candidate", and that by not preselecting him, Labor was effectively conceding the election. Former Premiers Paul Lennon and Lara Giddings also expressed support for his candidacy.

Winter ended up being preselected as the sixth candidate for Franklin, following intervention from the party's national executive. Winter was ultimately elected as one of two Labor MPs in Franklin, beating incumbent MP Alison Standen.

References

1985 births
Living people
Australian Labor Party members of the Parliament of Tasmania
Members of the Tasmanian House of Assembly
21st-century Australian politicians
Mayors of places in Tasmania